Sangiang is an island midway in the Sunda Strait between the Indonesian islands of Sumatra and Java. Administratively it is a part of Banten province of western Java. One current design for the ambitious Sunda Strait Bridge allows for part of the bridge to be built crossing the island.  It is uninhabited due to its status as a nature preserve.

The colonial Dutch called the island Dwars-in-den-weg ('Thwart-the-Way'; 'In the Way').

References

See also

 Islands of Indonesia

Islands of the Sunda Strait
Uninhabited islands of Indonesia
Islands of Indonesia